Kristen Avery Pittman (born April 9, 1989 as Christopher Frank Pittman in Franklin, Massachusetts) was convicted in 2005 of murdering her grandparents Joe and Joy Pittman, on November 28, 2001, when she was 12 years old. The case drew national attention due to both her age at the time of the crime and her defense that paranormal entities had influenced her actions. Pittman was sentenced to 30 years to life in prison.

Medication
At age twelve Pittman ran away from home twice, threatened suicide, was picked up by police, and confined to a facility for troubled or runaway children. She was confined there for six days. While there, she was put on Paxil for mild depression. Her father, Joe, sent her away from their home in Oxford, Florida, to live with her grandparents in Chester, South Carolina. Her paternal grandparents had been a source of stability to her for years in a life with a mother who had run out on her twice and a father whom Pittman claimed to have been abusive.

Her doctor in Chester, having no samples of Paxil to give Pittman, gave her samples of Zoloft instead. Although both drugs are SSRIs (selective serotonin reuptake inhibitors) with similar modes of selective action, abruptly substituting one for the other is usually not advisable. Almost immediately Pittman allegedly began to experience negative side-effects from the new medication; her sister went so far as to describe her as "manic." She purportedly experienced a burning sensation all over her body which required pain medication.  She complained about the side effects of the drug. At a subsequent doctor's visit, his dosage was increased from 25 mg daily to 50 mg daily. Zoloft does have several side-effects in children, including aggravated depression, abnormal dreams, paranoid reactions, hallucinations, aggressive behavior and delusions. Risks from overdose include potential "manic reactions."

Events
Pittman had an argument on the school bus, choked a fellow student, and later disturbed the person playing piano in her church. That night, November 28, 2001, after being paddled by her grandfather for attempting to leave her room when she was told not to, Pittman went into her grandparents' bedroom and murdered them with their own shotgun which she had been taught how to use. After the murder she set fire to the house using a candle and papers. 
Pittman took her grandparents' car, their guns, her dog, and $33 and left. She was picked up after getting stuck two counties away. Before confessing, she told a story of a large black male who had kidnapped her after murdering her grandparents and setting fire to their house. When she ultimately confessed she proclaimed that her grandparents deserved what they got. Pittman's father testified that the incident occurred two days after Kristen's Zoloft dosage had been doubled.

Trial and Appeals
On Monday, January 31, 2005, three years after the murders, her trial as an adult began. The case involved several important issues, including considerations of mental capacity regarding her age; the other issue was the impact of Zoloft on her mental state.  There was also the consideration of whether her crime should be considered murder or some form of manslaughter.   Ultimately, the focus of the trial was on the Zoloft. The prosecution focused on proving that Pittman did know the difference between right and wrong, and her culpable mental status was revealed by such factors as planning the cover up such that she would escape before the fire started (by use of the candle), and the steps she took during her flight from the scene.

On February 15, 2005, Pittman was convicted of murder and sentenced to 30 years in prison. There was some controversy about the verdict: two of the jurors admitted feeling coerced into their decision, and another juror openly discussed the trial with his wife and bartender during deliberations.  On October 5, 2006, the South Carolina Supreme Court heard oral arguments on her
appeal. A petition to pardon Pittman was also presented at that time. The Justices were also asked to hold off on moving Pittman to the adult penitentiary, but the delay was denied. On June 11, 2007, the Court affirmed Pittman's conviction by a vote of 4-1.
Discovery Channel later in 2006 aired an episode of 48 Hours, which was devoted to the Pittman case.  On April 14, 2008, the United States Supreme Court declined to hear an appeal, which was based on an Eighth Amendment claim of cruel and unusual punishment (lengthy sentence for child).

On July 27, 2010, South Carolina Circuit Court Judge Roger Young approved Pitman's post conviction relief petition and granted her a new trial based on a finding of ineffective counsel. In November 2010 Judge Young refused a request by the state to reconsider his decision. In December 2010, Pittman entered into a plea bargain pursuant to which she pleaded guilty to the crime of voluntary manslaughter and received a 25-year sentence including time served from a 30-year to life sentence. She is currently imprisoned in the Allendale Correctional Institution with a projected release date of 22 February 2023.

While in prison, Christopher Pittman legally changed first names to identify as a transgender woman named Kristen Avery Pittman.  Following release on February 1, 2023, Pittman will complete two years of state supervision through a South Carolina probation office.

References 

1989 births
Living people
American people convicted of murder
Minors convicted of murder
People convicted of murder by South Carolina
People from Sumter County, Florida
People from Chester, South Carolina